In House (Spanish: Casadentro) is a 2012 Peruvian drama film written and directed by Joanna Lombardi in her directorial debut. Starring Élide Brero and Delfina Paredes, it premiered on October 18, 2012 in Peruvian theaters.

Synopsis 
In this film, four generations of women live together who are forced to interact, to look at each other and not look at each other, to spend a night in the same house. It is a film that trusts that the real conflicts arise in everyday life, behind the day-to-day, behind breakfast.

Cast 
The actors participating in this film are:

 Élide Brero as Pilar
 Delfina Paredes as Consuelo
 Stephanie Orúe as Milagros

Production 
The film was filmed with S/.470,000 obtained after winning the Conacine 2010 Feature Film Contest. The filming of the film ended on June 1, 2011, and the post-production stage ended at the end of 2011.

Awards 

 Montreal World Film Festival
 Winner - Best Fiction First Film

 36th Word Film Festival
 Winner - Golden Zenith

References

External links 

 

2012 films
2012 drama films
Peruvian drama films
Tondero Producciones films
2010s Spanish-language films
2010s Peruvian films
Films set in Peru
Films shot in Peru
Films about old age
Films about families
2012 directorial debut films